The 2009 term of the Supreme Court of the United States began October 5, 2009, and concluded October 3, 2010. The table illustrates which opinion was filed by each justice in each case and which justices joined each opinion.

Table key

2009 term opinions

2009 term membership and statistics
This was the fifth term of Chief Justice Roberts' tenure, the first term for Justice Sotomayor, and the last term for Justice Stevens.

Notes

References

 

Lists of United States Supreme Court opinions by term